Paul Sindelar is an American professor. He is professor emeritus of the department of special education at the University of Florida.

Sindelar attended Dartmouth College, where he earned a Bachelor of Arts degree in 1969. He then attended the University of Illinois Urbana-Champaign, where he earned a Master of Science degree in 1974, and the University of Minnesota, where he earned his Doctor of Philosophy degree in 1977. He was distinguished professor in the department of special education of University of Florida. He retired in 2022.

References 

Living people
Place of birth missing (living people)
Year of birth missing (living people)
American academics
University of Florida faculty
20th-century American academics
21st-century American academics
Dartmouth College alumni
University of Illinois Urbana-Champaign alumni
University of Minnesota alumni